Bartolomeo Barbiani (1596–1645) was an Italian painter of the Baroque period, active in Umbria.

He was born in Montepulciano, but appears to have painted mainly in Umbria. He was a pupil of Antonio Circignani (Pomarancio). He is documented as painting for the following churches:
Santa Monica, Amelia (1642)
San Nicolò, Montecastrilli (1639)
San Michele, Stroncone (1628)
Sant'Antonio, Todi (1642)
Sant'Ilario, Todi (1640)
San Silvestro, Todi

References 

1596 births
1645 deaths
People from Montepulciano
17th-century Italian painters
Italian male painters
Italian Baroque painters